A fountain pen is a writing instrument which uses a metal nib to apply a water-based ink to paper. It is distinguished from earlier dip pens by using an internal reservoir to hold ink, eliminating the need to repeatedly dip the pen in an inkwell during use. The pen draws ink from the reservoir through a feed to the nib and deposits the ink on paper via a combination of gravity and capillary action. Filling the reservoir with ink may be achieved manually, via the use of an eyedropper or syringe, or via an internal filling mechanism which creates suction (for example, through a piston mechanism) or a vacuum to transfer ink directly through the nib into the reservoir. Some pens employ removable reservoirs in the form of pre-filled ink cartridges.

History

Early prototypes of reservoir pens
According to Qadi al-Nu'man al-Tamimi (d. 974) in his Kitab al-Majalis wa 'l-musayarat, the Fatimid caliph Al-Mu'izz li-Din Allah in Arab Egypt demanded a pen that would not stain his hands or clothes, and was provided with a pen that held ink in a reservoir, allowing it to be held upside-down without leaking.

There is compelling evidence that a working fountain pen was constructed and used during the Renaissance by artist and inventor Leonardo da Vinci. Leonardo's journals contain drawings with cross-sections of what appears to be a reservoir pen that works by both gravity and capillary action. Historians also took note of the fact that the handwriting in the inventor's surviving journals is of a consistent contrast throughout, rather than exhibiting the characteristic fading pattern typical of a quill pen caused by expending and re-dipping. While no physical item survives, several working models were reconstructed in 2011 by artist Amerigo Bombara that have since been put on display in museums dedicated to Leonardo.

European reservoir models

The fountain pen was available in Europe in the 17th century and is shown by contemporary references. In Deliciae Physico-Mathematicae (a 1636 magazine), German inventor Daniel Schwenter described a pen made from two quills. One quill served as a reservoir for ink inside the other quill. The ink was sealed inside the quill with cork. Ink was squeezed through a small hole to the writing point. In 1663 Samuel Pepys referred to a metal pen "to carry ink". Noted Maryland historian Hester Dorsey Richardson (1862–1933) documented a reference to "three silver fountain pens, worth 15 shillings" in England during the reign of Charles II, c. 1649–1685. By the early 18th century such pens were already commonly known as "fountain pens". Hester Dorsey Richardson also found a 1734 notation made by Robert Morris the elder in the ledger of the expenses of Robert Morris the younger, who was at the time in Philadelphia, for "one fountain pen". Perhaps the best-known reference, however, is that of Nicholas Bion (1652–1733), whose illustrated description of a "plume sans fin" was published in 1709 in his treatise published in English in 1723 as "The Construction and Principal Uses of Mathematical Instruments". The earliest datable pen of the form described by Bion is inscribed 1702, while other examples bear French hallmarks as late as the early 19th century.

First patents
Progress in developing a reliable pen was slow until the mid-19th century because of an imperfect understanding of the role that air pressure plays in the operation of pens. Furthermore, most inks were highly corrosive and full of sedimentary inclusions. The first English patent for a fountain pen was issued in May 1809 to Frederick Fölsch, with a patent covering (among other things) an improved fountain pen feed issued to Joseph Bramah in September 1809. John Scheffer's patent of 1819 was the first design to see commercial success, with a number of surviving examples of his "Penographic" known. Another noteworthy pioneer design was John Jacob Parker's, patented in 1832 – a self-filler with a screw-operated piston. The Romanian inventor Petrache Poenaru received a French patent on May 25, 1827, for the invention of a fountain pen with a barrel made from a large swan quill.

Mass-manufactured nibs
In 1828, Josiah Mason improved a cheap and efficient slip-in nib in Birmingham, England, which could be added to a fountain pen and in 1830, with the invention of a new machine, William Joseph Gillott, William Mitchell, and James Stephen Perry devised a way to mass manufacture robust, cheap steel pen nibs (Perry & Co.). This boosted the Birmingham pen trade and by the 1850s, more than half the steel-nib pens manufactured in the world were made in Birmingham. Thousands of skilled craftsmen were employed in the industry. Many new manufacturing techniques were perfected, enabling the city's factories to mass-produce their pens cheaply and efficiently. These were sold worldwide to many who previously could not afford to write, thus encouraging the development of education and literacy.

New patents and inventions
In 1848, American inventor Azel Storrs Lyman patented a pen with "a combined holder and nib". From the 1850s, there was a steadily accelerating stream of fountain pen patents and pens in production. However, it was only after three key inventions were in place that the fountain pen became a widely popular writing instrument. Those were the iridium-tipped gold nib, hard rubber, and free-flowing ink.

The first fountain pens making use of all these key ingredients appeared in the 1850s. In the 1870s Duncan MacKinnon, a Canadian living in New York City, and Alonzo T. Cross of Providence, Rhode Island, created stylographic pens with a hollow, tubular nib and a wire acting as a valve. Stylographic pens are now used mostly for drafting and technical drawing but were very popular in the decade beginning in 1875. In the 1880s the era of the mass-produced fountain pen finally began. The dominant American producers in this pioneer era were Waterman, of New York City, and Wirt, based in Bloomsburg, Pennsylvania. Waterman soon outstripped Wirt, along with many companies that sprang up to fill the new and growing fountain pen market. Waterman remained the market leader until the early 1920s.

At this time, fountain pens were almost all filled by unscrewing a portion of the hollow barrel or holder and inserting the ink by means of an eyedropper – a slow and messy procedure. Pens also tended to leak inside their caps and at the joint where the barrel opened for filling. Now that the materials' problems had been overcome and the flow of ink while writing had been regulated, the next problems to be solved were the creation of a simple, convenient self-filler and the problem of leakage. In 1890, W. B. Purvis patented a self-filler. Self-fillers began to arrive around the turn of the century; the most successful of these was probably the Conklin crescent-filler, followed by A. A. Waterman's twist-filler. The tipping point, however, was the runaway success of Walter A. Sheaffer's lever-filler, introduced in 1912, paralleled by Parker's roughly contemporary button-filler.

Pen leakage
Meanwhile, many inventors turned their attention to the problem of leakage. Some of the earliest solutions to this problem came in the form of a "safety" pen with a retractable point that allowed the ink reservoir to be corked like a bottle. The most successful of these came from Francis C. Brown of the Caw's Pen and Ink Co. and from Morris W. Moore of Boston.

In 1898, George Safford Parker released the Parker Jointless, named so because its barrel was single-piece to prevent leakage. The section assembly fit into the pen's end like a cork stopper; any leaked ink was kept inside the nib.

In 1908, Waterman began marketing a popular safety pen of its own. For pens with non-retractable nibs, the adoption of screw-on caps with inner caps that sealed around the nib by bearing against the front of the section effectively solved the leakage problem (such pens were also marketed as "safety pens", as with the Parker Jack Knife Safety and the Swan Safety Screw-Cap).

Further innovation

In Europe, the German supplies company which came to be known as Pelikan was started in 1838, and they first introduced their pen in 1929. This was based upon the acquisition of patents for solid-ink fountain pens from the factory of Slavoljub Penkala from Croatia (patented 1907, in mass production since 1911), and the patent of the Hungarian Theodor Kovacs for the modern piston filler by 1925.

The decades that followed saw many technological innovations in the manufacture of fountain pens. Celluloid gradually replaced hard rubber, which enabled production in a much wider range of colors and designs. At the same time, manufacturers experimented with new filling systems. The inter-war period saw the introduction of some of the most notable models, such as the Parker Duofold and Vacumatic, Sheaffer's Lifetime Balance series, and the Pelikan 100.

During the 1940s and 1950s, fountain pens retained their dominance: early ballpoint pens were expensive, were prone to leaks and had irregular inkflow, while the fountain pen continued to benefit from the combination of mass production and craftsmanship. (Bíró's patent, and other early patents on ball-point pens often used the term "ball-point fountain pen," because at the time the ball-point pen was considered a type of fountain pen; that is, a pen that held ink in an enclosed reservoir.)
This period saw the launch of innovative models such as the Parker 51, the Aurora 88, the Sheaffer Snorkel, and the Eversharp Skyline and (later) Skyliner, while the Esterbrook J series of lever-fill models with interchangeable steel nibs offered inexpensive reliability to the masses.

Popular usage

By the 1960s, refinements in ballpoint pen production gradually ensured its dominance over the fountain pen for casual use. Although cartridge-filler fountain pens are still in common use in France, Italy, Germany, Austria, India, and the United Kingdom, and are widely used by young students in most private schools in England, at least one private school in Scotland, and public elementary schools in Germany, a few modern manufacturers (especially Montblanc, Graf von Faber-Castell, and Visconti) now depict the fountain pen as a collectible item or a status symbol, rather than an everyday writing tool. However, fountain pens continue to have a growing following among many who view them as superior writing instruments due to their relative smoothness and versatility. Retailers continue to sell fountain pens and inks for casual and calligraphic use. Recently, fountain pens have made a resurgence, with many manufacturers of fountain pens saying sales are climbing. This has led to a new wave of casual use fountain pens and custom ink manufacturers, who utilize online stores to easily sell fountain pens to a wider audience.

Feed
The feed of a fountain pen is the component that connects the nib of the pen with its ink reservoir. It not only allows the ink to flow to the nib (in what is often described as a "controlled leak") but also regulates the amount of air flowing backwards up to the reservoir to replace this lost ink.

The feed uses of a series of narrow channels or "fissures" that run down its lower edge. As ink flows down these fissures, air is simultaneously allowed to flow upwards into the reservoir in an even exchange of volumes. The feed allows ink to flow when the pen is being put to paper but ensures ink does not flow when the pen is not in use. The feed makes use of capillary action; this is noticeable when a pen is refilled with a brightly coloured ink. The ink is taken up and into the feed by way of capillary action (and is often visible in clear demonstrator pens), but is not dispensed onto the paper until the nib makes contact.

How the feed is shaped may determine the wetness and flow of a particular pen. For this reason, feed material alone and its surface roughness may have a significant effect on the way two pens of the same nib size write.

Pen feeds are crucial to preventing ink from dripping or leaking. Feeds often feature finned structures intended for buffering fountain pen ink. Buffering is the capacity to catch and temporarily hold an overflow of ink, caused by conditions other than writing. When a fountain pen nib receives such an overflow it will result in ink blobbing or dripping also known as burping. A pen with a misconfigured feed might fail to deposit any ink whatsoever.

Fiber feeds 
Some fountains pens use a fiber wick underneath the nib. They often have a plastic part that looks like a feed that is only used to hold the fiber wick in place and does not assist with ink flow. The mechanism of action is like a felt pen, just with a fountain pen nib on top of it. The fiber feeds offer plenty of ink flow and can stay wet for extended periods. Cleaning fiber feed pens can require longer soaking in water.

Nibs

According to Mathur et al., "the modern fountain pen nib may be traced back to the original gold nib which had a tiny fragment of ruby attached to form the wear-point." Following the discovery of the platinum group of metals which include ruthenium, osmium, and iridium, "a small quantity of iridium was isolated and used on the iridium-tipped gold dip pen nibs of the 1830s." Today, nibs are usually made of stainless steel or gold alloys, with the most popular gold content being 14 carat (58⅓%) and 18 carat (75%). Titanium is a less common metal used for making nibs. Gold is considered the optimum metal for its flexibility and its resistance to corrosion, although gold's corrosion resistance is less of an issue than in the past because of better stainless steel alloys and less corrosive inks.
Visconti used to use nibs made out of palladium, as it acts like gold, but have now changed to using gold for most of their nibs as it is easier to source.

Nib plating
Further gold plating provides favorable wettability, which is the ability of a solid surface to reduce the surface tension of a liquid in contact with it such that it spreads over the surface.

Nib tipping

Gold and most steel and titanium nibs are tipped with a hard, wear-resistant alloy that typically includes metals from the platinum group. These metals share qualities of extreme hardness and corrosion resistance. The tipping material is often called "iridium", but there are few, if any, nib or pen manufacturers that used tipping alloys containing iridium metal since the mid-1950s. The metals osmium, rhenium, ruthenium, and tungsten are used instead, generally as an alloy, with a little bit of osmium, rhenium, ruthenium, and tungsten in a mix of other materials, produced as tiny pellets which are soldered or welded onto a nib tip prior to cutting the nib slit and grinding the tip into its final shape. Untipped steel and titanium points will wear more rapidly due to abrasion by the paper.

Capillary action
The nib usually has a tapering or parallel slit cut down its centre, to convey the ink down the nib by capillary action, as well as a "breather hole" of varying shape. The breather hole has no actual function regarding controlling the ink or air flow. Its main function is to provide an endpoint to the nib slit and forestall inaccuracies during nib slit cutting. Adding distance between the breather hole and the nib tip adds elasticity or flexibility to the nib. The breather hole also acts as a stress relieving point, preventing the nib from cracking longitudinally from the end of the slit as a result of repeated flexing during use.

The whole nib narrows to a point where the ink is transferred to the paper. Broad calligraphy pens may have several slits in the nib to increase ink flow and help distribute it evenly across the broad point. Nibs divided into three 'tines' are commonly known as music nibs. This is because their line, which can be varied from broad to fine, is suited for writing musical scores.

Types of nibs
Although the most common nibs end in a round point of various sizes (extra fine, fine, medium, broad), various other nib shapes are available. Examples of this are double broad, music, oblique, reverse oblique, stub, italic, and 360-degree nibs.

Broader nibs are used for less precise emphasis, with the benefit of a greater level of ink shading, a property wherein ink pools in parts of a stroke to cause variations in color or sheen – where dyes in ink crystallize on a page instead of absorbing into the paper, which leads to a different color being seen on less absorbent paper due to thin film interference. Finer nibs (e.g. extra fine and fine) may be used for intricate corrections and alterations, at the expense of shading and sheen. Oblique, reverse oblique, stub, and italic nibs may be used for calligraphic purposes or for general handwritten compositions. The line width of a particular nib may vary based on its country of origin; Japanese nibs are often thinner in general.

Nib flexibility
Flexibility is given to nibs in several ways. First, the thickness of the nib metal changes flex. When the nib alloy has been pressed thick it will result in a hard nib, while thinly pressed nibs are more flexible. Nibs can be pressed so that they are thinner at the tip and thicker at the feed to mitigate stiffness or to give a more controlled flex. Second, the curve of the nib determines in part how stiff the nib will be.

Nibs pressed into more deeply convex curves, or into three or five faceted curves, will be stiffer than flatter nibs. Third, the "breather hole" size, shape, and position alter the stiffness. Heart-shaped holes will improve flex as they widen, while round, small holes stiffen the pen. Fourth, the length of the tines determines how far they can spread under pressure, shorter tines make a stiffer nib. Fifth, the alloy used can affect stiffness: as mentioned before, gold is considered superior for its flex compared to steel. Moreover, purer gold (18k and 21k) is softer than most lower gold concentration (14k) alloys.

Fountain pens dating from the first half of the 20th century are more likely to have flexible nibs, suited to the favored handwriting styles of the period (e.g. Copperplate script and Spencerian script). By the 1940s, writing preferences had shifted towards stiffer nibs that could withstand the greater pressure required for writing through carbon paper to create duplicate documents.

Furthermore, competition between the major pen brands such as Parker and Waterman, and the introduction of lifetime guarantees, meant that flexible nibs could no longer be supported profitably. In countries where this rivalry was not present to the same degree, such as the UK and Germany, flexible nibs are more common.

Nowadays, stiff nibs are the norm as people exchange between fountain pens and other writing modes. These more closely emulate the ballpoint pens most modern writers are experienced with. Despite being rigid and firm, the idea that steel nibs write "horribly" is a misconception. More flexible nibs can be easily damaged if excessive pressure is applied to them. Ideally, a fountain pen's nib glides across the paper using the ink as a lubricant, and writing requires no pressure.

Good quality nibs that have been used appropriately are long lasting, often lasting longer than the lifetime of the original owner. Many vintage pens with decades-old nibs can still be used today.

Different nib styles
Other styles of fountain pen nibs include hooded (e.g. Parker 51, Parker 61, 2007 Parker 100, Lamy 2000, and Hero 329), inlaid (e.g. Sheaffer Targa or Sheaffer P.F.M) or integral Nib (Parker T-1, Falcon, and Pilot Myu 701), which may also be ground to have different writing characteristics.

Users are often cautioned not to lend or borrow fountain pens as the nib "wears in" at an angle unique to each individual person. A different user is likely to find that a worn-in nib does not write satisfactorily in their hand and, furthermore, creates a second wear surface, ruining the nib for the original user. This, however, is not a point of concern in pens with modern, durable tipping material, as these pens take many years to develop any significant wear.

Filling mechanisms

Eyedropper filler
The reservoirs of the earliest fountain pens were mostly filled by eyedropper. This was a cumbersome and potentially messy process, which led to the commercial development of alternative methods that quickly dominated the industry. However, newer, more convenient filling mechanisms have never entirely displaced "eyedropper-filling" pens in the marketplace, and they remain widely manufactured today. For some the simplicity of the mechanism, coupled with the large volume of ink it can encapsulate, compensates for the inconvenience of ink transfer.

After the eyedropper-filler era came the first generation of mass-produced self-fillers, almost all using a rubber sac to hold the ink. The sac was compressed and then released by various mechanisms to fill the pen.

Self-filling designs
The Conklin crescent filler, introduced c. 1901, was one of the first mass-produced self-filling pen designs. The crescent filling system employs an arch-shaped crescent attached to a rigid metal pressure bar, with the crescent portion protruding from the pen through a slot and the pressure bar inside the barrel. A second component, a C-shaped hard rubber ring, is located between the crescent and the barrel.

Ordinarily, the ring blocks the crescent from pushing down. To fill the pen, one simply turns the ring around the barrel until the crescent matches up to the hole in the ring, allowing one to push down the crescent and squeeze the internal sac.

Several other filling mechanisms were introduced to compete, such as the coin-filler (where a coin or 'medallion' was supplied along with the pen), match-filler (using a matchstick) and a 'blow-filler' which unsurprisingly required the pen owner to blow into the barrel to depress the internal sac.

Piston filling innovation
In 1907, Walter A. Sheaffer patented the Lever filler, using a hinged lever set into the pen barrel which pressed down onto a bar which in turn compressed the rubber sac inside, creating a vacuum to force ink into the pen. Introduced in 1912, this innovation was rapidly imitated by the other major pen makers. Parker introduced the button filler, which had a button hidden beneath a blind cap on the end of the barrel; when pressed, it acted on a pressure bar inside to depress the ink sac.

Following the crescent filler came a series of systems of increasing complexity, reaching their apogee in the Sheaffer Snorkel, introduced in 1952. The Sheaffer "Snorkel" system filled the ink sac through a retractable tube above and behind the pen point. This eliminated the need to dunk the point in ink, and the subsequent need to wipe it. With the advent of the modern plastic ink cartridge in the early 1950s, though, most of these systems were phased out in favour of convenience (but reduced capacity).

Screw-mechanism piston-fillers were made as early as the 1820s, but the mechanism's modern popularity begins with the original Pelikan of 1929, based upon a Croatian patent. The basic idea is simple: turn a knob at the end of the pen, and a screw mechanism draws a piston up the barrel, sucking in ink. Thus they were easier to fill, and pens with this mechanism remain very popular today. Some of the earlier models had to dedicate as much as half of the pen length to the mechanism.
The advent of telescoping pistons has improved this; the Touchdown Filler was introduced by Sheaffer in 1949. It was advertised as an "Exclusive Pneumatic Down-stroke Filler."

To fill it, a knob at the end of the barrel is unscrewed and the attached plunger is drawn out to its full length. The nib is immersed in ink, the plunger is pushed in, compressing and then releasing the ink sac by means of air pressure. The nib is kept in the ink for approximately 10 seconds to allow the reservoir to fill. This mechanism is very closely modeled after a similar pneumatic filler introduced by Chilton over a decade earlier.

Modern filling mechanisms

A capillary filling system was introduced by Parker in the Parker 61 in 1956. There were no moving parts: the ink reservoir within the barrel was open at the upper end, but contained a tightly rolled length of slotted, flexible plastic. To fill, the barrel was unscrewed, the exposed open end of the reservoir was placed in ink and the interstices of the plastic sheet and slots initiated capillary action, drawing up and retaining the ink. The outside of the reservoir was coated with Teflon, a repellent compound that released excess ink as it was withdrawn. Ink was transferred through a further capillary tube to the nib. No method of flushing the device was offered, and because of problems from clogging with dried and hardened ink, production was eventually stopped.

Around the year 2000, Pelikan introduced a filling system involving a valve in the blind end of the pen, which mates with a specially designed ink bottle. Thus docked, ink is then squeezed into the pen barrel (which, lacking any mechanism other than the valve itself, has nearly the capacity of an eyedropper-fill pen of the same size). This system had been implemented only in their "Level" line, which was discontinued in 2006.

Most pens today use either a piston filler, squeeze-bar filler or cartridge. Many pens are also compatible with a converter, which has the same fitting as the pen's cartridge and has a filling mechanism and a reservoir attached to it. This enables a pen to fill either from cartridges or from a bottle of ink. The most common type of converters are piston-style, but many other varieties may be found today. Piston-style converters generally have a transparent round tubular ink reservoir. Fountain pen inks feature differing surface tensions that can cause an ink to adhere or "stick" against the inside of the reservoir. Common solutions for this problem are adding a small (rust-proof) ink agitating object like a 316 or 904L stainless steel or zirconium dioxide bearing ball, spring or hollow tube in the tubular reservoir to mechanically promote free movement of the contained ink and ink/air exchange during writing. Adding a very small amount of surfactant such as Triton X-100 used in Kodak Photo-Flo 200 wetting agent to the ink will chemically promote free movement of the contained ink and ink/air exchange during writing. However, ink might react adversely to adding a surfactant.

Vacuum fillers, such as those used by Pilot in the Custom 823, utilize air pressure to fill the ink chamber. In this case, while the nib is submerged in ink, a plunger is pushed down the empty chamber to create a vacuum in the space behind it. The end of the chamber has a section wider than the rest, and when the plunger passes this point, the difference in air pressure in the area behind the plunger and the area ahead of it is suddenly evened out and ink rushes in behind the plunger to fill the chamber.

Cartridges
A patent for an ink cartridge system for fountain pens was filed in 1890. In the early 20th century, cartridges were made from glass and thin copper tubing. However, the concept only became successful and popular after the introduction of moulded plastic cartridges, firstly by Waterman in 1953.
Modern plastic cartridges can contain small ridges on the inside to promote free movement of the contained ink and ink/air exchange during writing. Often cartridges are closed with a small ball that gets pressed into the cartridge during insertion into the pen. This ball also aids free movement of the contained ink.

Standard international

Most European fountain pen brands (for example Caran d'Ache, Faber-Castell, Michel Perchin, DuPont, Montegrappa, Stipula, Pelikan, Montblanc, Europen, Monteverde, Sigma, Delta, Italix, and Rotring) and some pen brands of other continents (for example Acura, Bexley, Retro51, Tombow, and Platinum (with adaptor)) use so called "international cartridges" (AKA "European cartridges" or "standard cartridges" or "universal cartridges"), in short (38 mm in length, about 0.75 ml of capacity) or long (72 mm, 1.50 ml) sizes, or both. It is to some extent a standard, so the international cartridges of any manufacturer can be used in most fountain pens that accept international cartridges.

Also, converters that are meant to replace international cartridges can be used in most fountain pens that accept international cartridges. Some very compact fountain pens (for example Waterman Ici et La and Monteverde Diva) accept only short international cartridges. Converters can not be used in them (except for so-called mini-converters by Monteverde). Some pens (such as the modern Waterman models) have intentional fittings which prevent the usage of short cartridges. Such pens can only take a proprietary cartridge from the same manufacturer, in this case the long Waterman cartridges.

Proprietary offerings

Many fountain pen manufacturers have developed their own proprietary cartridges, for example Parker, Lamy, Sheaffer, Cross, Sailor, Platinum, Platignum, Waterman, and Namiki. Fountain pens from Aurora, Hero, Duke, and Uranus accept the same cartridges and converters that Parker uses and vice versa (Lamy cartridges, though not officially, are known to interchange with Parker cartridges also). Cartridges of Aurora are slightly different from cartridges by Parker.

Corresponding converters to be used instead of such proprietary cartridges are usually made by the same company that made the fountain pen itself. Some very compact fountain pens accept only proprietary cartridges made by the same company that made that pen, such as Sheaffer Agio Compact and Sheaffer Prelude Compact. It is not possible to use a converter in them at all. In such pens the only practical way to use another brand of ink is to fill empty cartridges with bottled ink using a syringe.

Standard international cartridges are closed by a small ball, held inside the ink exit hole by glue or by a very thin layer of plastic. When the cartridge is pressed into the pen, a small pin pushes in the ball, which falls inside the cartridge. The Parker and Lamy cartridges do not have such a ball. They are closed by a piece of plastic, which is broken by a sharp pin when inserted in the pen.

Concerns and alternatives
Pen manufacturers using a proprietary cartridge (which in almost all cases are the more expensive ones like the ones mentioned above) tend to discourage the use of cheaper internationally standardised short/long cartridges or adaptations thereof due to their variance in ink quality in the cartridges which may not offer as much performance, or be of lesser quality than the manufacturer of the pen; ink that has been designed specifically for the pen. In addition, cheaper ink tends to take longer to dry on paper, may skip or produce uneven colour on the page and be less "tolerant" on lower, thinner grades of paper (e.g. 75gs/m).

While cartridges are mess-free and more convenient to refill than bottle filling, converter and bottle filling systems are still sold. Non-cartridge filling systems tend to be slightly more economical in the long run since ink is generally less expensive in bottles than in cartridges. Advocates of bottle-based filling systems also cite less waste of plastic for the environment, a wider selection of inks, easier cleaning of pens (as drawing the ink in through the nib helps dissolve old ink), and the ability to check and refill inks at any time.

Inks

Inks intended for use with fountain pens are water-based. These inks are commonly available in bottles. Plastic cartridges came into use in the 1960s, but bottled inks are still the mainstay for most fountain pen enthusiasts. Bottled inks usually cost less than an equivalent amount in cartridges and afford a wider variety of colors and properties.

Fountain pens are not as tightly coupled with their inks as ballpoints or gel pens are, yet some care must be taken when selecting their inks. Contemporary fountain pen inks are almost exclusively dye-based because pigment particles usually clog the narrow passages.

Traditional iron gall inks intended for dip pens are not suitable for fountain pens as they will corrode the pen (a phenomenon known as flash corrosion) and destroy the functionality of the fountain pen. Instead, modern surrogate iron gall formulas are offered for fountain pens. These modern iron gall inks contain a small amount of ferro gallic compounds, but are gentler for the inside of a fountain pen, but can still be corrosive if left in the pen for a long period. To avoid corrosion on delicate metal parts and ink clogging a more thorough than usual cleaning regime – which requires the ink to be flushed out regularly with water – is sometimes advised by manufacturers or resellers.

Some pigmented inks do exist for fountain pens, such as "Carbon Black" made by the brand Platinum, but these are uncommon. Normal India ink cannot be used in fountain pens because it contains shellac as a binder which would very quickly clog such pens.

Inks ideally should be fairly free-flowing, free of sediment, and non-corrosive, though this generally excludes permanence and prevents large-scale commercial use of some colored dyes. Proper care and selection of ink will prevent most problems.

Today

While no longer the primary writing instrument in modern times, fountain pens are still used for important official works such as signing valuable documents. Today, fountain pens are often treated as luxury goods and sometimes as status symbols. Fountain pens may serve as an everyday writing instrument, much like the common ballpoint pen. Good quality steel and gold pens are available inexpensively today, particularly in Europe and China, and there are "disposable" fountain pens such as the Pilot Varsity. In France and Germany, in particular, the use of fountain pens is widespread. To avoid mistakes, special ink can be used that can be made invisible by applying an ink eraser.

Fountain pens can serve various artistic purposes such as expressive penmanship and calligraphy, pen and ink artwork, and professional art and design. Many users also favor the air of timeless elegance, personalization, and sentimentality associated with fountain pens, which computers and ballpoint pens seem to lack, and often state that once they start using fountain pens, ballpoints become awkward to use due to the extra motor effort needed and lack of expressiveness.

For ergonomics, fountain pens may relieve physiological stress from writing; alternatives such as the ballpoint pen can induce more pain and damage to those with arthritis. Some also believe they could improve academic performance. In some countries, fountain pens are usual in lower school grades, believed to teach children better control over writing as many common mistakes of people not used to handwriting (like too much pressure or incorrect hold) feel unnatural or are almost impossible when using traditional pen tips.

Some fountain pens are treated as collectibles. Ornate pens may be made of precious metals and jewels with cloisonné designs. Some are inlaid with lacquer designs in a process known as maki-e. Avid communities of pen enthusiasts collect and use antique and modern pens and also collect and exchange information about old and modern inks, ink bottles, and inkwells. Collectors may decide to use the antiques in addition to showcasing them in closed spaces such as glass displays.

News outlets report that, rather than declining, fountain pen sales have been steadily rising over the last decade. There is a clear resurgence in the appeal and culture of the fountain pen, whether for purposes of collection, enjoyment or as a "lifestyle item". Many agree that the "personal touch" of a fountain pen has led to such a resurgence with modern consumers looking for an alternative in a world of digital products and services.

Amazon reported "sales so far this year [2012] have doubled compared with the same period in 2011. They are four times higher than 2010." The popularity of fountain pens continues to show growth. The market-research firm Euromonitor reported that fountain pen retail sales were up 2.1% in 2016 from a year earlier, reaching $1.046 billion.

See also
 Demonstrator pen
 Fountain pen inks
 Inkwell
 IAMPETH
 :Category: Fountain pen and ink manufacturers
 List of pen types, brands and companies
 List of terms about pen and ink

Notes and references

Bibliography

Further reading

External links

 Reddit Fountain Pens
 Branded Fountain Pens Collection
 The Fountain Pen Network

Arab inventions
Egyptian inventions
Fountain pen and ink manufacturers
Pens
Writing implements